Marion Bartoli defeated Sabine Lisicki in the final, 6–1, 6–4 to win the ladies' singles tennis title at the 2013 Wimbledon Championships. She won the title without losing a set, or facing a tiebreak in any set. Bartoli became the first French major champion since Amélie Mauresmo at the 2006 Wimbledon Championships. By winning her maiden major title in her 47th appearance, she broke the previous women's record of 45, set by Jana Novotná in 1998, for most appearances in majors before winning a title. This was also Bartoli's final major appearance, as she retired from professional tennis the following month.

Serena Williams was the defending champion, but lost to Lisicki in the fourth round, ending a 34-match winning streak dating back to the Miami Open. It was only her third loss of the season, and her first since Doha. This was the fourth consecutive occasion where Lisicki defeated the reigning French Open champion at Wimbledon, following victories over Svetlana Kuznetsova in 2009, Li Na in 2011, and Maria Sharapova in 2012 (Lisicki did not play at Wimbledon in 2010).

The exits of Li Na and Petra Kvitová in the quarterfinals ensured a maiden major titlist. Lisicki was the first German major finalist of either gender since Rainer Schüttler at the 2003 Australian Open, while Bartoli was the first Frenchwoman to contest a major final since herself in 2007. The final marked the second time in the Open Era, after 1998, that neither Wimbledon finalist was a former major champion.

Seeds

  Serena Williams (fourth round)
  Victoria Azarenka (second round, withdrew)
  Maria Sharapova (second round)
  Agnieszka Radwańska (semifinals)
  Sara Errani (first round)
  Li Na (quarterfinals)
  Angelique Kerber (second round)
  Petra Kvitová (quarterfinals)
  Caroline Wozniacki (second round)
  Maria Kirilenko (first round)
  Roberta Vinci (fourth round)
  Ana Ivanovic (second round)
  Nadia Petrova (first round)
  Samantha Stosur (third round)
  Marion Bartoli (champion)
  Jelena Janković (second round)

  Sloane Stephens (quarterfinals)
  Dominika Cibulková (third round)
  Carla Suárez Navarro (fourth round)
  Kirsten Flipkens (semifinals)
  Anastasia Pavlyuchenkova (first round)
  Sorana Cîrstea (second round)
  Sabine Lisicki (final)
  Peng Shuai (second round)
  Ekaterina Makarova (third round)
  Varvara Lepchenko (first round)
  Lucie Šafářová (second round)
  Tamira Paszek (first round)
  Alizé Cornet (third round)
  Mona Barthel (second round)
  Romina Oprandi (first round, retired)
  Klára Zakopalová (third round)

Qualifying

Draw

Finals

Top half

Section 1

Section 2

Section 3

Section 4

Bottom half

Section 5

Section 6

Section 7

Section 8

Championship match statistics

References

External links

2013 Wimbledon Championships on WTAtennis.com
2013 Wimbledon Championships – Women's draws and results at the International Tennis Federation

Women's Singles
Wimbledon Championship by year – Women's singles
Wimbledon Championships
Wimbledon Championships